Gode Wind 1, 2, and 3 are offshore wind farms located north-west of Norderney in the German sector of North Sea. They are owned by Ørsted. Gode Wind 1 and 2 are operational, while Gode Wind 3 is being developed.

The projects were originally developed by PNE Wind AG who had received approvals for Gode Wind 1 and 2 from Germany's Federal Agency for Marine Shipping and Hydrography.  In August 2012, the projects were acquired by Ørsted (then named DONG Energy).

Planning

The combined capacity of the three projects will be up to 900 MW. 
Gode 1 has a capacity of 332 MW, Gode 2 has a capacity of 252 MW, and Gode 3 will have a capacity of 316 MW.
Originally REpower Systems was to supply 54 6-MW turbines for Gode 1 and Vestas was to supply 84 3-MWturbines for Gode 2. 
These deals were re-tendered by Ørsted S, which has contracted 154 direct-drive 6MW turbines from Siemens Wind Power.
The cable connection is 900 MW HVDC, capable of connecting other wind farms, and connection to shore grid is guaranteed by TenneT. 
The underwater noise was monitored during construction. 
The platform called Dolwin Beta was installed in August 2015.

Gode Wind 1 & 2
On 18 November 2013, Ørsted announced the decision to invest €2.2 billion in Gode 1 & 2. The wind farm is eligible for the Stauchungsmodell support regime, and the electricity price is fixed for 10 years. Bladt Industries will supply the foundations, with a diameter of 6 meters. Gode 1 & 2 consist of a total of 97 Siemens SWT-6.0-154 turbines generating up to 582 MW. The projects were officially commissioned in June 2017.

See also

Wind power in Germany
List of offshore wind farms

References

External links
 Photos: World's biggest WTG monopiles
 Gode 1, 2 and 3 on 4C.

Offshore wind farms in the North Sea
Wind farms in Germany
Energy infrastructure completed in 2017
2017 establishments in Germany